Katerina City (Russian: Гостиница Катерина Сити) is a hotel in the centre of Moscow, Russia. It is located not far from Paveletskaya metro station, Riverside Tower and Aurora business centers, 3 km away from Red Square and Kremlin.

Katerina City is one of the Katerina chain hotels managed by UMACO company. The hotel consists of two interconnected buildings. The first building is a four-storey mansion built in the 19th century and fully renovated in 1998. The second building is an eight-storey modern one, was built in 2000.  The hotel is noted as a Swedish-style hotel, designed by Sweco Avista FFNS AB. The hotel has 120 rooms; 66 small rooms, 44 medium and 10 large rooms. Meeting facilities include 8 conference halls for 2-120 guests.

External links

Online hotel booking Huffpost

Hotels in Moscow
Houses completed in the 19th century
Hotels established in 1998